The 2009 Formula BMW Americas season was the sixth, and final, season of the Formula BMW Americas series. The championship was contested over fourteen races at six meetings, supporting various series such as the World Touring Car Championship and the American Le Mans Series. Gabriel Chaves was the final series champion, having finished in the top three in all fourteen races. The series was cancelled on July 31, 2009 as a result of a tough economic climate, which also led to the discontinuation of BMW's Formula One outfit.

Teams and drivers
All cars were Mygale FB02 chassis powered by BMW engines.

Calendar

Standings
Points were awarded as follows:

References

External links
 BMW-Motorsport.com

Formula BMW seasons
Formula BMW Americas
BMW Americas